Chad Torress Slade (born May 4, 1992) is an American football guard who is a free agent. He played college football at Auburn.

College career
Slade was a four-year starter at Auburn from 2010-14. His 49 career starts were the second most among SEC offensive lineman and fourth-most in Auburn history.

Professional career

Houston Texans
Slade signed with the Houston Texans as an undrafted free agent on May 8, 2015. He was placed on injured reserve on September 5, 2015, where he spent his entire rookie season.

On September 3, 2016, Slade was waived by the Texans and was signed to the practice squad the next day. He signed a reserve/future contract with the Texans on January 16, 2017 after spending the entire season on their practice squad.

On September 2, 2017, Slade was waived by the Texans and was signed to the practice squad the next day. He was promoted to the active roster on November 29, 2017.

On September 1, 2018, Slade was waived by the Texans and was signed to the practice squad the next day.

New York Giants
On January 14, 2019, Slade signed a reserve/future contract with the New York Giants. He was waived on September 6, 2020, and re-signed to the practice squad. He was elevated to the active roster on September 14, November 2, and November 7 for the team's weeks 1, 8, and 9 games against the Pittsburgh Steelers, Tampa Bay Buccaneers, and Washington Football Team, and reverted to the practice squad after each game. He signed a reserve/future contract on January 4, 2021.

On August 31, 2021, Slade was released by the Giants.

References

External links
Auburn Tigers bio
Houston Texans bio
New York Giants bio

1992 births
Living people
People from St. Clair County, Alabama
Players of American football from Alabama
American football offensive guards
Auburn Tigers football players
Houston Texans players
New York Giants players